Boletopsis grisea is a species of fungus in the family Bankeraceae. The fruit bodies are gray, fleshy polypores that grow on the ground in a mycorrhizal association with Scots pine (Pinus sylvestris). It is found in Asia, North America, and Europe.

Taxonomy
The fungus was first described in 1874 as a species of Polyporus by American mycologist Charles Horton Peck in 1874, who made the type collection in Copake, New York. Appollinaris Semenovich Bondartsev and Rolf Singer transferred it to Boletopsis in 1941.

Description
The fruit body is a fleshy polypore that grows from the ground. The gray cap is convex and irregular with a dry surface. Underneath the cap are white pores. The stout stipe is the same colour as the cap.

Distribution and habitat
Boletopsis grisea is found in Europe, and in both Canada and the United States, growing on nutrient-poor acidic soils. It has a mycorrhizal association with Scots pine (Pinus sylvestris), as well as lichens and heath plants as understorey.

Status
B. grisea is a threatened species in Europe, where it has been short-listed for inclusion in the Berne Convention on the Conservation of European Wildlife and Natural Habitats by the European Council for Conservation of Fungi.  It has been recorded from 15 countries, and appears on five Regional Red Lists. Threats to the fungus include deforestation, air pollution, and the use of fertilizers and lime used to increase timber production.

Research
Research has identified p-terphenyl compounds that impart a free radical scavenging activity in laboratory tests. Eight phenolic compounds have been isolated and identified from the fruit bodies, including three that inhibit the enzyme 5-lipoxidase.

References

External links

Fungi described in 1874
Fungi of Asia
Fungi of Europe
Fungi of North America
Thelephorales
Taxa named by Charles Horton Peck